Pygidicranidae is a family of earwigs, formerly placed in the suborder Forficulina, now in the suborder Neodermaptera.  The family currently contains twelve subfamilies and twenty six genera.  Eight of the subfamilies are monotypic, each containing a single genus.  Of the subfamilies, both Astreptolabidinae and Burmapygiinae are extinct and known solely from fossils found in Burmese amber.  Similarly Archaeosoma, Gallinympha, and Geosoma, which have not been placed into any of the subfamilies, are also known only from fossils.  Living members of the family are found in Australia, South Africa, North America, and Asia.  The monotypic genus Anataelia, described by Ignacio Bolivar in 1899, is found only on the Canary Islands.  As with all members of Neodermaptera, pygidicranids do not have any ocelli. The typical pygidicranid bodyplan includes a small, flattened-looking body, which has a dense covering of bristly hairs (setae).  The pair of cerci at the end of the abdomen are symmetrical in structure. The head is broad, with the fourth, fifth and sixth antenna segments (antennomeres) that are not transverse.  In general Pygidicranids also have equally sized ventral cervical sclerites, and in having the rearmost sclerite separated from, or only touching the center of the prosternum.  Cannibalism of young has been observed in at least one species in the family, Challia hongkongensis, in which an adult female was found eating a still-living nymph of the same species. The same species in a different area has been observed possibly eating fruits or seeds, making the species an omnivore.

Taxonomy
Current Pygidicranidae subfamilies and genera, as listed in the Dermaptera Species File.

Pygidicranidae Verhoeff, 1902

 Genus Cylindopygia Yang et al. 2015 (Aptian;Yixian Formation)

Subfamily Anataeliinae Burr, 1909 (Syn. Anataelinae)
Genus Anataelia Bolivar, 1899
Subfamily †Astreptolabidinae Engel, 2011
Genus †Astreptolabis Engel, 2011 (Cenomanian; Burmese Amber)
Subfamily Blandicinae Burr, 1915
Genus Alloblandex Hincks, 1957
Genus Austroblandex Brindle, 1987
Genus Blandex Burr, 1912
Genus Parablandex Brindle, 1966
Subfamily Brindlensiinae Srivastava, 1985
Genus Brindlensia Srivastava, 1985
Subfamily †Burmapygiinae Engel & Grimaldi, 2004
Genus †Burmapygia Engel & Grimaldi, 2004 (Cenomanian; Burmese Amber)
Subfamily Challiinae Steinmann, 1973 (Syn. Challinae)
Genus Challia Burr, 1904
Subfamily Cylindrogastrinae Maccagno, 1929
Genus Cylindrogaster Stal, 1855
Subfamily Diplatymorphinae Boeseman, 1954
Genus Diplatymorpha Boeseman, 1954
Subfamily Echinosomatinae Burr, 1910 (Syn. Prolabisciinae, Prolabiscinae, Protolabidinae, Protolabinae)
Genus Echinosoma AudinetServille, 1839
Genus Parapsalis Borelli, 1921
Subfamily Esphalmeninae Burr, 1909
Genus Esphalmenus Burr, 1909
Subfamily Pygidicraninae Verhoeff, 1902
Genus Acrania Burr, 1915
Genus Cranopygia Burr, 1908
Genus Dacnodes Burr, 1907
Genus Mucrocranopygia Steinmann, 1986
Genus Paracranopygia Steinmann, 1986
Genus Pygidicrana AudinetServille, 1831
Genus Tagalina Dohrn, 1862
Subfamily Pyragrinae Verhoeff, 1902
Genus Echinopsalis de Bormans, 1893
Genus Pyragra AudinetServille, 1831
Genus Pyragropsis Borelli, 1908
Subfamily incertae sedis
Genus †Archaeosoma Zhang, 1994
Genus †Gallinympha Perrichot & Engel, 2011
Genus †Geosoma Zhang, 1997

References

Dermaptera families
Taxa named by Karl Wilhelm Verhoeff